Blidingia marginata is a species of seaweed in the Kornmanniaceae family.

Description

Distribution
It can be found in such African countries as Azores, South Africa, Algeria, and Morocco. It can be found in various gulfs, oceans and seas such as Gulf of Maine and Gulf of Mexico, in Atlantic Ocean and Mediterranean Sea. It is also common on Bermuda, Cuba, and Tristan da Cunha. The North American distribution is varied by state in the United States but can be found in Canada and Mexico as well. The states that carry the species are Georgia, North Carolina, Virginia, Connecticut, Maine, Massachusetts and New Jersey. In Asia it is found only in Japan while in South America it is found in Argentina, Brazil and Uruguay.

Australasian distribution
It is found in New Zealand and southern Australia where it is found in Recherche Archipelago, Streaky Bay, Ardrossan and Port Adelaide.

European distribution
In Europe, it is found in Belgium, Ireland, France, Spain, Sweden, and United Kingdom. It is also common on the shores of Portugal and Norway.

Habitat
The species is commonly found with Juncus species.

References

Further reading

Ulvales
Plants described in 1958
Flora of South Africa
Flora of Europe
Flora of North America